Kim Nam-hee is a South Korean actor and model. He is known for his roles in dramas Mr. Sunshine, Spring Turns to Spring, and Sweet Home.

Personal life
He got married on September 29, 2018 to his long-term girlfriend whom he has dated for 10 years since his college days.

Filmography

Film

Television series

Web series

Television shows

Theater

Awards and nominations

References

External links
 
 

1986 births
Living people
South Korean male models
21st-century South Korean male actors
South Korean male film actors
South Korean male television actors
Seokyeong University alumni